Shingle Kill is a stream in the U.S. state of New York. It is a tributary to the Delaware River.

The name "Shingle Kill" is derived from the Dutch name Syngle Kill, perhaps after a local shingle mill.

References

Rivers of Orange County, New York